Bruce Kenneth Childs (born 23 August 1934) is a former Australian politician. Born in Sydney, he was a tradesman in photo engraving and a secretary of the Printing and Kindred Industries Union before becoming Assistant General Secretary of the New South Wales Labor Party 1971–1980. In 1980, he was elected to the Australian Senate as a Labor Senator for New South Wales. He resigned his place on 10 September 1997, and was replaced by George Campbell.

References

Australian Labor Party members of the Parliament of Australia
Members of the Australian Senate for New South Wales
Members of the Australian Senate
1934 births
Living people
Australian trade unionists
Australian printers
20th-century Australian politicians